Gulnaz Radikovna Gubaydullina (born 14 February 1992) is a Russian modern pentathlete. She has qualified for the 2016 Summer Olympics. At the 2017 World Modern Pentathlon Championships, Gubaydullina won the gold medal in the individual competition, becoming the second Russian woman to do so (the other being Elizaveta Suvorova in 1997).

Biography
Gubaydullina was born to a Bashkir father and a Tatar mother. She started swimming in Novy Urengoy at the age of six. When she was thirteen, she participated in the double-event, winning gold in a local tournament. Gubaydullina is a four-times junior and youth European champion, and a world youth silver medalist. She is a bronze medalist in the mixed event at the 2010 Summer Youth Olympics.

The Russian became fourth at the 2015 European Modern Pentathlon Championships, giving her a place at the 2016 Summer Olympics. Although Gubaydullina set a new record in 200 m swimming (2:07.94) at the Olympics, she finished just 15th (following the disqualification of Chen Qian she took the 14th position).

Gubaydullina and Belyakov won the mixed event of the 2017 European Modern Pentathlon Championships in Minsk, Belarus.

At the 2020 Summer Olympics held in Tokyo, Japan in 2021, Gubaydullina started off by showing the best result in swimming, setting an Olympic Record (2:07.31). However, she was eliminated in the third stage, after her randomly assigned horse 'Saint Boy' refused to continue jumping, leaving her without a medal at the end, although having the 6th best time in the final stage.

She won the 2021 Cup of the President of the Russian Federation (former Kremlin Cup), after winning the fencing, swimming and the final laser run stages.

References

External links 
 

1992 births
Living people
Russian female modern pentathletes
Modern pentathletes at the 2016 Summer Olympics
Modern pentathletes at the 2020 Summer Olympics
Olympic modern pentathletes of Russia
Modern pentathletes at the 2010 Summer Youth Olympics
World Modern Pentathlon Championships medalists
People from Yamalo-Nenets Autonomous Okrug
Tatar people of Russia
Tatar sportspeople
Volga Tatars
Sportspeople from Yamalo-Nenets Autonomous Okrug
21st-century Russian women